The following is a list of ecoregions in Algeria, according to the Worldwide Fund for Nature (WWF).

Terrestrial ecoregions

Palearctic

Temperate coniferous forests
 Mediterranean conifer and mixed forests

Mediterranean forests, woodlands, and scrub
 Mediterranean dry woodlands and steppe
 Mediterranean woodlands and forests

Deserts and xeric shrublands
 North Saharan steppe and woodlands
 Sahara Desert
 South Saharan steppe and woodlands
 West Saharan montane xeric woodlands

Flooded grasslands and savannas
 Saharan halophytics

Freshwater ecoregions
 Permanent Maghreb
 Temporary Maghreb
 Dry Sahel

Marine ecoregions
 Alboran Sea
 Western Mediterranean

References
 Burgess, Neil, Jennifer D’Amico Hales, Emma Underwood (2004). Terrestrial Ecoregions of Africa and Madagascar: A Conservation Assessment. Island Press, Washington DC.
 Spalding, Mark D., Helen E. Fox, Gerald R. Allen, Nick Davidson et al. "Marine Ecoregions of the World: A Bioregionalization of Coastal and Shelf Areas". Bioscience Vol. 57 No. 7, July/August 2007, pp. 573-583.
 Thieme, Michelle L. (2005). Freshwater Ecoregions of Africa and Madagascar: A Conservation Assessment. Island Press, Washington DC.

Ecoregions of Africa

Algeria
Ecoregions